Hiromi Makihara (born August 11, 1963) is a former Nippon Professional Baseball pitcher. He was a six-time Central League All-Star, won Rookie of the Year honors, and pitched a perfect game in a 19-year career with the Yomiuri Giants.

See also
 Masaki Saito
 Masumi Kuwata

External links
 

1963 births
Living people
Baseball people from Aichi Prefecture
People from Handa, Aichi
Japanese baseball players
Nippon Professional Baseball pitchers
Yomiuri Giants players
Nippon Professional Baseball Rookie of the Year Award winners
Nippon Professional Baseball pitchers who have pitched a perfect game